Carlos Alberto Brenes Jarquín (2 December 1884 in Masaya – 2 January 1942 in Managua) was the President of Nicaragua from 9 June 1936 to 1 January 1937. He was a member of the Nationalist Liberal Party. Brenes was the president of the lower chamber of National Congress of Nicaragua in 1933. He was installed as president by national guard commander Anastasio Somoza Garcia following a military coup on 9 June 1936, and remained in office until Somoza became president on 1 January 1937.

References

1884 births
1942 deaths
People from Masaya
Nationalist Liberal Party politicians
Presidents of Nicaragua
Presidents of the Chamber of Deputies (Nicaragua)